Javor ("maple" in Slavic languages) may refer to:


Places
Javor, Albania, a settlement in Albania
Javor, Busovača, a village in Bosnia and Herzegovina
Javor (Kakanj), a village in Bosnia and Herzegovina
Javor (Klatovy District), a municipality and village in the Czech Republic
Javor, a village and part of Teplice nad Metují in the Czech Republic
Javor, a village and part of Votice in the Czech Republic
Javor, Iran, a village in Zanjan Province
Javor, Ljubljana, a settlement in Slovenia
Javor (Novi Pazar), a village in Serbia

Mountains
 Javor (Bosnia and Herzegovina), a mountain in eastern Bosnia and Herzegovina
 Javor (Serbia), a mountain in western Serbia

People
 Benedek Jávor (born 1972), Hungarian biologist, environmentalist and politician
 Pál Jávor (disambiguation), several Hungarians
 Javor Mills (born 1979), American former National Football League player

Other uses
 FK Javor Ivanjica, a Serbian football club based in Ivanjica

See also
Jawor (disambiguation)
Javornik (disambiguation)
Javorje (disambiguation)